The 1975 Kilkenny Senior Hurling Championship was the 81st staging of the Kilkenny Senior Hurling Championship since its establishment by the Kilkenny County Board.

Fenians were the defending champions.

On 16 November 1975, James Stephens won the championship after a 1–14 to 1–05 defeat of Galmoy in the final. It was their fourth championship title overall and their first title in six championship seasons.

Participating teams

Results

Semi-finals

Final

References

Kilkenny Senior Hurling Championship
Kilkenny Senior Hurling Championship